Peter Desmond Harbison (born 14 January 1939, Dublin) is an Irish archaeologist and author.

Harbison is Professor of Archaeology and a member (elected in 1979) of the Royal Irish Academy (Arts division), and the academy's Honorary Academic Editor. He is also an honorary Fellow of Trinity College Dublin, an honorary member of the Royal Institute of the Architects of Ireland (RIAI) and author of 36 books.

His main scientific work is the three-volume publication The High Crosses of Ireland from 1992. In addition to his monument guide, however, Harbison became widely known through numerous publications aimed at the general public, which provide an introduction to the early history of Ireland and its artistic monuments. 

In 1978, together with Homan Potterton, director of the Irish National Gallery, and Jeanne Sheehy, he published his first art volume, "Irish Art and Architecture" (Thames & Hudson), where he surveyed  Irish art up to 1600 AD. His 1988 book Pre-Christian Ireland won the British Archaeological Book Award in the same year. Other important art volumes include The Golden Age of Irish Art which covers Medieval art in the period between 600–1200 AD.

References 

1939 births
Archaeologists from Dublin (city)
Members of the Royal Irish Academy
Living people